The Central Valley School District (CVSD) was established on July 1, 2009. It comprises the former Center Area and Monaca school districts, and includes the municipalities of Center Township, Potter Township, and Monaca Borough in Beaver County, Pennsylvania. The Central Valley School District represents the first “Voluntary” merger of public school districts in the Commonwealth of Pennsylvania. The merger was a five-year process due to opposition from those who opposed the plan.

There are approximately 18,000 residents living throughout the Central Valley School District communities.

Central Valley School District operates four schools: Center Grange Primary School, Todd Lane Elementary School, Central Valley Middle School and Central Valley High School. High school students may choose to attend Beaver County Career and Technology Center for training in the construction and mechanical trades. Beaver Valley Intermediate Unit IU27 provides the district with a wide variety of services like specialized education for disabled students and hearing, speech and visual disability services and professional development for staff and faculty.

Current Buildings

Extracurriculars
Central Valley School District offers a wide variety of clubs, activities and an extensive sports program.

Sports
The district funds:
Varsity

Boys
Baseball - AAA
Basketball- AAA
Bowling - AAAA
Cross country - AA
Football - AAA
Golf - AAA
Soccer - AA
Tennis - AA
Track and field - AAA
Wrestling - AA
Swimming - AA

Girls
Basketball - AAA
Bowling - AAAA
Cross country - AA
Golf - AAA
Gymnastics - AAAA
Soccer (Fall) - AA
Softball - AAA
Girls' tennis - AA
Track and field - AAA
Volleyball - AA 
 Swimming - AA

Middle school

Boys
Baseball
Basketball
Football
Soccer
Track and field
Wrestling	

Girls
Basketball
Soccer (Fall)
Softball 
Track and field
Volleyball

According to PIAA directory July 2014

References

External links
Central Valley School District

School districts established in 2009
School districts in Beaver County, Pennsylvania
2009 establishments in Pennsylvania